Brett Robert Jankouskas (born August 18, 1991) is an American soccer player who played for the Harrisburg City Islanders in the United Soccer League.

Career
Jankouskas began playing college soccer at Syracuse University in 2010, before transferring to Lander University in 2011.

Jankouskas signed with United Soccer League club Harrisburg City Islanders on March 24, 2015. He scored his first professional goal for the City Islanders on May 2, 2015 in a 4-0 win over Wilmington Hammerheads FC.

References

External links
 Syracuse University bio
 Lander University bio

1991 births
Living people
American soccer players
American expatriate soccer players
Syracuse Orange men's soccer players
Penn FC players
Association football forwards
Soccer players from Pennsylvania
USL Championship players
Soccer players from Sacramento, California
Lander University alumni